Mukho is a harbor in Donghae City, Gangwon Province, South Korea.  It is located on the shore of the Sea of Japan .  In the past it played an important role in the shipping of iron ore and coal; much of this role has been taken over by Donghae Harbor in recent years.  Mukho is an important harbor of refuge and home to a large number of fishing vessels.  A passenger ferry operates from the port to Ulleung Island.  The harbor is connected to land-based transportation by two stations on the Yeongdong Line and an interchange on the Donghae Expressway. The ship Mangyongbong 92 carrying a 140 person delegation for the 2018 Winter Olympics from North Korea berthed at this harbor, as protesters opposing North Korea subsequently gathered singing Aegukga. The harbor first opened in 10.14.1937.

See also
Transportation in South Korea
List of seaports

External links 
 Port profile from Donghae City (English)

Donghae City
Ports and harbours of South Korea
Neighbourhoods in South Korea